The name Pilar has been used for two tropical cyclones in the Eastern Pacific Ocean.

 Tropical Storm Pilar (1987) – a weak and short-lived tropical storm that dissipated before affecting land. 
 Tropical Storm Pilar (2017) – minimal tropical storm that brushed the Mexican coastline with heavy rainfall.

Pacific hurricane set index articles